Strings is a 2012 British drama film directed and written by Rob Savage. After a successful run in a number of film festivals, it went on to win the Raindance Award at the British Independent Film Awards. Applauded for its success despite its low budget, the total cost of production was just £3,000. Director, writer, cinematographer and editor, Savage took strong commitments to get the film produced including lack of sleep to the point of hallucinating.

Plot
The story follows four young people and their romantic endeavours in that blissful summer before they leave home to go to university. Grace (Philine Lembeck) is a visiting German student, soon to return home. She falls for the quiet, distant Jon (Oliver Malam), whilst her best friend Scout (Hannah Wilder) becomes entangled in an increasingly violent relationship with her long-term boyfriend Chris (Akbar Ali).

Cast
 Philine Lembeck as Grace
 Oliver Malam as Jon
 Hannah Wilder as Scout
 Sid Akbar Ali as Chris
 Giorgio Spiegelfeld as Giorgio
 Sandra Hüller as Mother
 Durassie Kiangangu as Michael

Production

Writing
Savage was originally working on the short film Sit In Silence when he watched the film Requiem. He was so moved by the lead actresses (Sandra Hüller) performance that he contacted her when they met in Munich. After that Hüller introduced Savage to another actress she was mentoring at the time: Philine Lembeck. After that Savage began re-writing the script and spent an entire year re-writing it.

Filming
Strings was shot on a Sony FX-1 with an SG Blade 35mm Lens.  Filming took roughly a month.

Distribution
The film won the Raindance Award at British Independent Film Awards. It was there, where it was recognised by Vertigo Films. Vertigo Films picked up the film on 5 December 2012.

References

External links
 

2012 films
Films set in England
Films shot in Gloucestershire
2012 drama films
British drama films
2010s English-language films
2010s British films